The 1906–07 Yale Bulldogs men's ice hockey season was the 12th season of play for the program.

Season

The team did not have a coach, however, C. Buchanan Stuart served as team manager.

Roster

Standings

Schedule and Results

|-
!colspan=12 style="color:white; background:#00356B" | Regular Season

References

Yale Bulldogs men's ice hockey seasons
Yale
Yale
Yale
Yale